John George Mulcahy (12 August 1876 – 12 August 1950) was an Australian rules footballer who played with Fitzroy in the Victorian Football League (VFL).

Family
The son of John Stephen Mulcahy (1852-1932), and Margaret Jane Mulcahy (1856-1930), née Roberts, John George Mulcahy was born on 12 August 1876.

He married Edith Annie Merrifield (1877-1951) on 17 December 1902. They had two children: John Merrifield Mulcahy (1904-1987) and Charles Edgar Mulcahy (1906-1986).

He died on 12 August 1950.

Football
He was recruited from the Montague Football Club, a team in the Metropolitan Junior Football Association (MJFA) — more generally referred to in the press of the day as the Victorian Junior Football Association — the competition from which the teams that formed the VFL's Reserve Grade competition were drawn in 1919.

Footnotes

References
Holmesby, Russell & Main, Jim (2009). The Encyclopedia of AFL Footballers. 8th ed. Melbourne: Bas Publishing.

External links

 

Fitzroy Football Club players
1876 births
1950 deaths
Australian rules footballers from Victoria (Australia)
People from Clunes, Victoria